Tamil Nadu Industrial Development Corporation (TIDCO) is a governmental agency in the state of Tamil Nadu, India. It is responsible for the development of industries in the state and often partners with companies in the Indian government's Small Industries Development Corporation program. The managing director is Jayashree Muralidharan.

References

External links
Official website

Government of Tamil Nadu
Economy of Tamil Nadu